Menon was an anti-submarine mortar used by the Italian Navy during the Cold War.

Description

The initial version consisted of a three-barrel mortar in a rotating, enclosed mounting that was usually positioned forward of the superstructure, but aft of the gun mounts. This was replaced by the K 113 weapon with a single  barrel in the same type of mounting, albeit with a fixed elevation of 45°. The K 113 fired a seven-round pattern, loaded automatically from a seven-round cylinder.

Short-barreled models were also used, although details are lacking.

Cites

Bibliography

305 mm artillery
Anti-submarine mortars
Explosive weapons
Naval weapons of the Cold War
Naval weapons of Italy
Military equipment introduced in the 1950s